Carl Brown (born 30 October 1950) is a Jamaican former professional football player, who played as a defender, and manager.

Playing career
Brown was born in Kingston and played for Boys' Town F.C.

In 1970, Brown made his debut for the Jamaica national team. He represented at the 1975 Pan American Games.

Post-playing career
From 1990 to 1994, 2001 to 2004, and in 2006, he coached the Jamaica national team. Between August 2007 and June 2011, he was a head coach of the Cayman Islands national football team.

As of 2014, he served on the CONCACAF Technical Committee.

References

External links

Profile at Soccerpunter.com

Living people
1950 births
Sportspeople from Kingston, Jamaica
Association football defenders
Jamaican footballers
Boys' Town F.C. players
Jamaica international footballers
Pan American Games competitors for Jamaica
Footballers at the 1975 Pan American Games
Jamaican football managers
Jamaica national football team managers
Cayman Islands national football team managers
Expatriate football managers in the Cayman Islands
Jamaican expatriate football managers
Jamaican expatriate sportspeople in the Cayman Islands